The fourth Gotabaya Rajapaksa cabinet, also known as the Rajapaksa-Wickremesinghe cabinet, was the central government of Sri Lanka led by President Gotabaya Rajapaksa. It was formed in May 2022 following the appointment of Ranil Wickremesinghe as the new Prime Minister and ended in July 2022 following Rajapaksa's resignation.

This was the 6th time Wickremesinghe served as Prime Minister of Sri Lanka, a world record.

Cabinet members
Ministers appointed under article 43(1) of the constitution. The members cabinet is as follows:

State ministers
Ministers appointed under article 44(1) of the constitution.

Notes

References 

Rajapaksa, Gotabaya cabinet 4
Rajapaksa, Gotabaya cabinet 4
Rajapaksa, Gotabaya cabinet 4

Gotabaya Rajapaksa
Cabinets disestablished in 2022
2022 disestablishments in Sri Lanka